Mantidactylus bellyi is a species of frog in the family Mantellidae. The species is endemic to Madagascar.

References

bellyi
Amphibians described in 1895
Endemic frogs of Madagascar
Madagascar dry deciduous forests